The 2010 season was Gyeongnam FC's fifth season in the K-League in South Korea. Gyeongnam FC is competing in K-League, League Cup and Korean FA Cup.

Current squad

K-League

Championship

Korean FA Cup

League Cup

Group stage

Knockout stage

Squad statistics

Appearances and goals
Statistics accurate as of match played 20 November 2010

Top scorers

Discipline

Transfer

In

Out

References

 Gyeongnam FC website

South Korean football clubs 2010 season
2010